Penthema darlisa, the blue kaiser, is a species of satyrine butterfly found along the Himalayas, extending into Southeast Asia.

Subspecies
Penthema darlisa darlisa (Assam to Burma, Yunnan, West Thailand)
Penthema darlisa mimetica Lathy, 1900 (south-eastern Thailand)
Penthema darlisa melema Riley & Godfrey, 1921 (northern Thailand, Laos, Vietnam)
Penthema darlisa merguia Evans, 1924 (southern Burma, Peninsular Thailand)
Penthema darlisa pallida Li, 1994 (Yunnan)

References

Satyrinae
Butterflies of Indochina